Xiong Fei (born October 21, 1987) is a Chinese football player who plays for Wuhan Three Towns as a right-back or defensive midfielder.

Club career
Xiong Fei originally played for the youth team of Wuhan Optics Valley and even graduated to their senior team at the beginning of the 2008 league season. When the senior team was disbanded during 2008 he was taken on by second tier club Nanjing Yoyo and would make his debut on April 19, 2009 in a league game against Guangdong Sunray Cave F.C. that ended in 1–0 defeat. His performance was good enough for him to gain a regular place within the team and he quickly showed his attacking potential despite being a defender when he scored his first goal against Nanchang Bayi on July 11, 2009 in a 1–1 draw. After having a personally  impressive season for Nanjing he would transfer to top tier side Shanghai Shenhua where he would eventually make his debut coming on as a late substitute for Jiang Kun in a league game on August 22, 2010 in a 1–0 victory against Chongqing Lifan. He would however struggle to get much playing time until the 2011 league season when the club's first choice right back Wu Xi would be pushed more into midfield and Xiong saw significantly more playing time where he eventually played in twelve league games by the end of the season.

On 19 July 2014, Xiong was loaned to China League One side Wuhan Zall until 31 December 2014. On his return he would start to establish himself as a regular until the introduction of Zhang Lu, who replaced him as the clubs first choice right-back. On 17 January 2018, Xiong transferred to Liaoning F.C. After twos seasons with the club he left on a free transfer on 23 May 2020 after Liaoning Football Club was disqualified by Chinese Football Association (CFA) due to wage arrears. On 5 August 2020, Xiong moved to Wuhan Three Towns. In his first season with the club he would go on to aid them in winning the division title and promotion into the second tier. This would be followed by another division title win and promotion as the club entered the top tier for the first tine in their history. The following campaign he would be part of the squad that won the 2022 Chinese Super League title.

Career statistics 
Statistics accurate as of match played 11 January 2023.

Honours

Club
Wuhan Three Towns
Chinese Super League: 2022.
China League One: 2021
China League Two: 2020

References

External links
Player profile at Shanghai Shenhua website
Player stats at sohu.com
 

1987 births
Living people
Footballers from Wuhan
Chinese footballers
Wuhan Guanggu players
Nanjing Yoyo players
Shanghai Shenhua F.C. players
Wuhan F.C. players
Liaoning F.C. players
Chinese Super League players
China League One players
Association football defenders
Association football midfielders
21st-century Chinese people